Bolson pupfish (Cyprinodon atrorus) is a species of freshwater fish in the family Cyprinodontidae.

It is endemic to northeastern Mexico, in the Río Salado and Cuatro Ciénegas river systems.

See also
Pupfish

References

External links
   IUCN Red List of Threatened Species website

Cyprinodon
Pupfish, Bolson
Pupfish, Bolson
Natural history of Coahuila
Natural history of Nuevo León
Natural history of Tamaulipas
Pupfish, Bolson
Taxa named by Robert Rush Miller
Pupfish, Bolson
Fish described in 1968
Taxonomy articles created by Polbot